Boidstones Place, also called Greenbrakes and Fountain Rock, was built in 1766 by Thomas Boydston near Shepherdstown, West Virginia on land he was granted by Thomas Fairfax, 6th Lord Fairfax of Cameron. In a dispute with Fairfax and Joist Hite over lands he had acquired along the Terrapin Neck on the Potomac River, Boydston lost most of his lands, which were acquired by Abraham Shepherd.  The property formed a portion of the Shepherd's holdings along Shepherd Grade, which were primarily devoted breeding race horses.  Some of the property was annexed to the adjoining Wild Goose property, owned by R.D. Shepherd, who had a racetrack there.  In 1851 R.D. Shepherd gave Boidstones to his nephew and namesake R. D. Shepherd, Jr. who built the main Greek Revival section of the house.  The property was sold out of the Shepherd family in 1886, but was returned to the Shepherds in 1916 for use as a summer place.

The original house at Boidstone Place is, with the Peter Burr House, the oldest framed building in West Virginia. The 1850s Greek Revival wing is also of wood-frame construction.  Another addition was made in the 1920s, in the Colonial Revival style.

Other structures on the farm include a log cabin (c. 1850), a log cottage (c. 1850s, altered in 1938), a tenant house (c. 1890), a springhouse (1850s), a garage (1920s), the main barn (c. 1850), a machine shed (c. 1910), a spray shed (c. 1920) and a bull shed (c. 1910) as well as a cemetery for slaves, active from c. 1776 to 1865.

A large spring on the property became known as Stillhouse Spring, where Boydston produced whiskey which was shipped down the river from a dock.

References

Houses on the National Register of Historic Places in West Virginia
Houses in Jefferson County, West Virginia
Plantation houses in West Virginia
Greek Revival houses in West Virginia
Georgian architecture in West Virginia
Colonial Revival architecture in West Virginia
Historic districts in Jefferson County, West Virginia
Houses completed in 1766
National Register of Historic Places in Jefferson County, West Virginia
Farms on the National Register of Historic Places in West Virginia
Colonial architecture in West Virginia
Historic districts on the National Register of Historic Places in West Virginia
Log buildings and structures on the National Register of Historic Places in West Virginia